Jodha may refer to:

 Jodha of Mandore
 Jodha Bai, the popular misnomer of Mariam-uz-Zamani, chief consort of Mughal Emperor Akbar
 Jodh Bai, Empress consort of Mughal Emperor Jahangir and a direct descendant of Jodha of Mandore
 Jodha and Jagroop
 ''Jodhaa Akbar, a 2008 Bollywood film 
 Jodha Akbar (TV series), a Hindi TV series 
 Jodha Akbar (Tamil TV series)